Carter the Unstoppable Sex Machine (also known as Carter USM or simply Carter) were an English indie rock band formed in 1987 by singer Jim "Jim Bob" Morrison and guitarist Les "Fruitbat" Carter. They made their name with a distinctive style of power pop, fusing samples, sequenced basses and drum machines with rock 'n' roll guitars and off-beat wordplay-loaded lyrics.  They reached the height of their fame in 1992. Over the following years the band took on new members, reaching a six-piece, but struggled to regain their earlier popularity. They initially split up in 1998 after releasing seven albums.

History

Starting out: 1987–1990
Based in Lambeth in South London, England, Carter and Morrison originally played in an indie band called Jamie Wednesday, which released two singles – "Vote For Love" and "We Three Kings of Orient Aren't". Carter the Unstoppable Sex Machine was formed on Thursday 6 August 1987, when Carter and Morrison were the only band members to turn up for a charity gig at the London Astoria, and went on stage to perform as a duo with backing tapes. The debut single "A Sheltered Life" was released later in 1988 on the Big Cat label, but it was not until the second single "Sheriff Fatman" was released in 1989 that the band began to receive recognition. The song was followed by the album 101 Damnations – a critical account of life south of the River Thames, full of black humour, cynicism, wordplay and puns. The album reached number 29 on the UK Albums Chart.

The band's gigs became well known for a wall of white stage lights that threw off enormous heat and contributed to the sweaty, stage-diving crowd scenes that became part of the band's image. Such scenes are depicted in the video In Bed With Carter, filmed at the Brixton Academy.

Rough Trade: 1991
In 1991 – having signed to Rough Trade Records – Carter USM released the album 30 Something which, thanks to non-stop touring, entered the UK Albums Chart at number eight. One of the singles released from the album, "Bloodsport For All", an attack on racism and bullying in the army, was released at the start of the Gulf War and consequently banned by the BBC. Spurred on by infamy, Jim Bob and Fruitbat toured Japan, Yugoslavia and the United States (with EMF) and made a second-on-the-bill appearance at the Reading Festival. The band also made its first Top of the Pops appearance with the single "After the Watershed (Early Learning The Hard Way)", a song about child abuse that would become more famous for its subsequent legal battle with The Rolling Stones' publisher over the use of the lyrics "Goodbye Ruby Tuesday" in the chorus. The band also hit the headlines when Fruitbat rugby tackled the children's TV presenter Phillip Schofield in front of millions of television viewers at the Smash Hits Poll Winners Party in 1991.

Chrysalis Records: 1992–1995
The demise of Rough Trade records necessitated a change of label, and Carter made the switch to Chrysalis Records to work on their third album. That album, 1992 – The Love Album, went straight to number one in the UK Albums Chart, propelling the band to pop stardom. Also, in 1992, the band headlined the Glastonbury Festival where Fruitbat, annoyed at the shortening of their headline set due to other bands overrunning insulted Michael Eavis and was subsequently banned from the festival forever. The band was unhappy, however, and this came across in the anger and cynicism of their next record, Post Historic Monsters.

In 1994, Carter's friend Wez, from former support band Resque, joined the band on drums and the newly inspired trio played America, Japan and Europe, including a major concert in Croatia which was recorded and later released on video. The recording was also given away as a free live album with Carter's fifth studio LP, Worry Bomb – a punk-pop album with upbeat material such as "Let's Get Tattoos" and slow acoustic songs such as "My Defeatist Attitude".

Cooking Vinyl: 1996–1998
In 1996, Carter left Chrysalis Records and joined Cooking Vinyl. With Salv from the band S*M*A*S*H on bass, Wez's brother Steve on guitar, and teenager Ben Lambert on keyboards, Carter became a six-piece band.

After signing to Cooking Vinyl they released a mini-album, A World Without Dave, and started their longest ever UK tour. The band then went back to Canada and the U.S. They decided to split shortly after their 10th anniversary, and their final studio album, I Blame The Government, was released in January 1998. Two further albums, Live! and BBC Sessions, were released in the same year, in June and October respectively.

Post-USM projects: 1999 – present
Les Carter currently lives in Folkestone and plays with the band Abdoujaparov and was announced on 27 November 2014 as the new guitarist for Ferocious Dog.  He plays bass with Keith TOTP.  He is also a former presenter on the Brentwood radio station Phoenix FM, having presented a regular weekly show between 2001 and 2011.   James Morrison's projects included the band Jim's Super Stereoworld before moving on to solo albums including Angelstrike! He has also written four books: Goodnight, Jim Bob, detailing his experiences on the road with Carter USM; and three novels – Storage Stories, Driving Jarvis Ham, The Extra Ordinary Life of Frank Derrick, Age 81, and Frank Derrick's Holiday of a Lifetime. He also appeared in Gutted – A Revengers Musical that debuted at the 2010 Edinburgh Fringe Festival.

EMI released Anytime Anyplace Anywhere, a "best of" record featuring tracks from the band's birth until their switch to Cooking Vinyl. This reportedly annoyed the band as they were not consulted or even made aware of the release of the record. In 2004 two new Carter CDs were released: a live album of BBC concerts from the early 1990s, and Brixton Mortars, a compilation album of tracks from their final two studio albums. In 2006, Carter released a new compilation of unreleased tracks and rarities called The Good, The Bad, The Average And Unique. Echoing the earlier Starry Eyed And Bollock Naked, the sleeve features a Volkswagen Beetle – this time a bright green new model convertible.  Autumn 2007 saw the release of a band-authorised best of compilation album spanning their entire career on EMI, under the title, You Fat Bastard.  The title came from a chant performed by the crowd at gigs.  It originated from MC (and lighting man) Jon "Fat" Beast's topless on-stage band introductions. Jon "Fat" Beast died on 27 July 2014.

Reunions

In 2001 and 2002, Jim Bob and Fruitbat toured as Who's The Daddy Now? The pair's two bands, Jim's Super Stereoworld and Abdoujaparov, would play a set each, after which the pair combined to perform a number of Carter USM songs. On 4 March 2007, almost ten years after the band last performed, Carter USM's original two-man line-up played a set of four songs as part of a gig to celebrate the life of Darren 'Wiz' Brown, former frontman of the Mega City Four, who had died in December 2006. The band had been booked to play acoustically but surprised the audience by playing a traditional electric set at the last moment.

Due to the success of this performance, Carter reunited for two 'farewell' gigs later that year. The first show took place on 2 November 2007 at London's Brixton Academy with support from Sultans of Ping. Another concert was later arranged, which took place at Glasgow Barrowlands on 20 October 2007. This was recorded for the "Back in Bed With Carter" DVD that contained the whole concert, along with an interview and rehearsal footage. Support at The Barrowlands came from The Frank and Walters and Chris T-T. The reunion celebrated twenty years since the band's foundation and ten years since their split. The gigs were performed as the original two-piece of Fruitbat and Jim Bob.

To coincide with the reunion EMI released a two-CD anthology, You Fat Bastard, compiled by Jim Bob and Fruitbat. The songs were digitally remastered at Abbey Road studios. This was released in conjunction with the majority of their back catalogue (albums and promo videos) being made available digitally for the first time by EMI.

On 6 February 2008, Jim Bob and Fruitbat hinted at the possibility of further Carter USM gigs when they sent an email to members of the band's mailing list. Two dates were then announced for Birmingham Academy and Brixton Academy for 21 and 22 November 2008. Support came from EMF at both gigs. Two further sell out gigs followed in London in November 2009, titled "The Drum Machine Years". Further concerts followed in November 2011, with the band playing Manchester Academy on Friday 18 November and London O2 Academy Brixton on Saturday 19 November.

In February 2012, more reunion concerts were announced, in Leeds O2 Academy on 9 November and London O2 Academy Brixton on Saturday 10 November. EMI also announced re-mastered versions of the albums 30 Something and 1992 – The Love Album to coincide with these concerts. Carter announced in February 2014 that they would play another one-off gig at the Brixton Academy on 22 November that year, billed as the final ever Carter the Unstoppable Sex Machine live show – The Last Tango in Brixton. Due to popular demand, a further date was added at Shepherd's Bush Empire on 21 November.

Discography

Studio albums

Compilation albums

Live albums

EPs

Singles

References

External links
 Official Carter USM website – Maintained by Fruitbat
 [ Carter USM's AMG entry]
 An essay on Carter from Freakytrigger
 An interview with Fruitbat about the 2008 shows from Culturedeluxe

 
English alternative rock groups
English indie rock groups
Alternative dance musical groups
English punk rock groups
Chrysalis Records artists
Rough Trade Records artists
Musical groups established in 1987
Musical groups disestablished in 1998
Musical groups from London
Musical groups from the Royal Borough of Greenwich